Margaret Hamilton Storey (July 31, 1900 – October 18, 1960) was an American museum curator, herpetologist and ichthyologist. She worked for the Stanford University Natural History Museum for over 25 years. 


Biography 
Storey was born in San Francisco, California, into an educated household. Her father, Thomas Storey, was the founder of the Stanford University School of Health. Storey attended Cornell University, receiving an A.B. degree in 1922 and received her master's degree in 1936 from Stanford University. She began working at the Stanford Natural History Museum first as a volunteer, but in 1940, was given a "regular staff appointment." Storey worked as both a curator at the museum and also as a librarian of the zoological book collection She worked closely with George S. Myers, supervising the curating. She also edited the Stanford Ichthyological Bulletin and Occasional Papers. She would work at the museum for over twenty-five years.

Storey collected herpetological specimens from the United States Southwest deserts, the Rocky Mountains and Maine. She contributed notes, information and corrections for books about reptiles and amphibians. She described several fish species, including Bascanichthys paulensis, Harengula majorina and Callechelys perryae, and, with Myers, Hesperomyrus fryi. A species of Cuban gecko, Sphaerodactylus storeyae, and a species of triplefin blenny, Axoclinus storeyae, are named in her honor. Storey and Meyers were also very involved in the Stanford Zoology Club, which dated back to the 1890s and in an ichthyology club called the Fishverein.

Storey also served as the only woman Amateur Athletic Union (AAU) track timer in the country for twenty six years.

Storey died after surgery on October 18, 1960. An award, given to the most improved runner on the Stanford Cardinals team, is named after her.

Publications

References

Citations

Sources

External links

1900 births
1960 deaths
Cornell University alumni
Stanford University alumni
Stanford University people
20th-century American women scientists
American ichthyologists
Women ichthyologists
American herpetologists
Women herpetologists
20th-century American zoologists
American women biologists